Operation Fly Inc. is a 501(c)(3) non-profit organization that was originally formed to serve the inner-city population within Washington, D.C., and its surrounding metropolitan area. They impact their community by coordinating myriad events for the homeless and providing programs for underprivileged students and their schools.

It serves as a national organization that spans 3 branches in New York City, Chicago, and Washington, D.C. To achieve these goals, the organization strives to pass out food to the homeless; to coordinate events such as banquets and events/programs for the homeless and economically underprivileged; and to provide for the general welfare of the inner-city underprivileged.

The program currently employs several students from different schools across the United States and Canada as volunteers and also strives to instill a stronger sense of altruism in the community through these volunteer efforts by fostering valuable leadership characteristics. Every aspect of this organization is student-led from fundraising, to event management, to public relations, to even corporate governance.



History
After more than two years in planning, Operation Fly Inc. was founded in 2007 by Timothy Hwang and Minsoo Han (both students from Thomas S. Wootton High School) in an effort to combat the growing poverty rate within the Washington DC Area. Currently in its starting years of operation, the organization employs several members from students all across Maryland State. As an all student-led organization, Operation Fly Inc. provides a "fresh new face to the war against poverty". Today, the organization has grown to encompass several branches across the nation. In the next five years, the organization is planning to expand to Detroit, Los Angeles, and Houston. While many of these branches are no longer active, Operation Fly is looking to rebuild these connections. It has collaborated with numerous student governments and churches (New Covenant Fellowship Church, Global Mission Church, etc.). The organization was most recently led by Arda Sahiner, who is now a student at UC Berkeley.

It was recently given much attention for an award given by Ernst & Young and Junior Achievement of the National Capital Area.

Operation Fly was recently a coalition partner in the Thomas S. Wootton High School Student Government's 'Spring Project', a part of a 'Rock the Vote' concert trying to engage students into being civically active. The concert was held April 28, 2012 and hosted by CNN's John King.

Motto
Its slogan is "Soar to New Possibilities". Its motto is "Service Through Leadership".

Mission, vision, goals

Their strategic plan claims the following and has the following goals:

"We provide the only completely student-run programs that target the inner-city and train student leaders simultaneously.

The best student-run organization that targets the inner-city in the USThe only international student-run organization that targets the inner-cityThe only student-run organization that provides scholarship programs for the inner-cityThe best student-run training program for public service in the USThe largest student-run organization that addresses poverty and inner-city issues

The cheapest tutoring programs in the metropolitan area whose profits go to the inner-city.The most innovative and fastest homeless student-run collection and distribution programsThe best leadership and financial literacy training programs by students in the USThe most effective and most innovative scholarship and tutoring programs by studentsThe most diverse amount of programs for any student-led non-profit organization"

Mission Part 1: Helping the Community Operation Fly Inc. has identified three groups of people in need inside Washington DC. Group 1: The HomelessGroup 2: The Financially Challenged StudentsGroup 3: People/Families struggling physically or financially

Each group will be targeted with specific action plans developed by either the Board of Directors or Department of Event ManagementGroup 1: Homeless Visitations/Food DonationsGroup 2: Scholarship Program, Tutoring ProgramsGroup 3: General Events depending on the constituency

Mission Part 2: Leadership Training Trait 1: AltruismTrait 2: DedicationTrait 3: VisionTrait 4: Responsibility

To change the hearts, minds, and lifestyles of this generation through a radical change in their perspective of this world.

Organization
The organization is owned by a board of directors composed (4) executive team, (1) the secretary, (5) outside directors, (3) student board members who do not belong in any department. Under the board of directors are the branches for Operation Fly Inc. based on regions (Washington, D.C., Baltimore, Chicago, Boston, New York).

Operation Fly's current CEO is Alice Zhou of Thomas S. Wootton High School.

Each branch is divided into four distinct departments: Human Resources, Event Management, Public Relations, and Marketing. Each of these departments are led by a member of the Management Team (a Vice-President), who is supervised by a Regional President. The executive team serves to oversee the entire organization.

The organization consists of two main different levels: the national branch, and the regional branch. In a regional branch (ex: Washington DC, New York, Chicago, etc.), a regional president presides as the leader.

He/she overlooks the performance of the branch in categories of marketing, human resources, etc. These categories are better known as departments. A regional branch is subdivided into individual departments. Each department has a vice president, who is basically in charge of managing his/her corresponding department. There is also an assistant vice president who will be working alongside the vice president to help the department function in its full capacity.

The bylaws also state that there is a position called the district president, representing a certain region of branches. For example, Washington, D.C., New York, Boston, and Baltimore represent District 1. As of FY 2008–2009, there is no operating district president, but as the number of branches increase, the national branch will start hiring candidates to fill the position. The district president is responsible for managing his/her district policies and reporting to the chief operating officer or the chief executive officer.

Since the group is a student-led organization, most of the activities are based on schools. In Operation Fly, each school is called a chapter, which is led by a chapter president. The school chapters are basically what a regional branch is made of. It is possible to view school chapters as the most basic level of the organization; from the national level, to the regional level, to the school level.

In theory, the school chapters are under the jurisdiction of the Human Resources Department. However, individual school chapters can conduct independent activities such as fundraising and gathering clothes in their schools.

In the national branch, national officers (also referred to as C-level officers) specialize in individual departments. They work to manage their specialties throughout all the branches. While regional presidents overlook all the departments in his/her branch, a national officer overlooks his/her corresponding departments in all branches. For example, while the regional president of Chicago overlooks all of his/her departments in Chicago, the Chief Human Resources Officer will manage all the Human Resources Department not only in Chicago, but also in New York, Washington, D.C., and other branches. In that sense, national office and regional presidents have some overlapping discretion, which are often compromised through communication. Program directors are also in place to organize specific programs in each department.

Each department also consists of divisions that divide the department’s jurisdiction. All the divisions are listed in Article VI, Section 6 of the bylaws. Each division has a division chief who leads the division and reports to the vice president/assistant vice president of the corresponding department.

References

Sources
 Ernst&Young: https://web.archive.org/web/20091114063314/http://myja.org/students/yeoty/
 Voice of America (Radio): http://operationfly.org/Media/USA%20NOW%20071509.Mp3
 Voice of America: http://www.voanews.com/korean/2009-07-15-voa25.cfm
 Washington Post: https://www.washingtonpost.com/wp-dyn/content/article/2009/07/11/AR2009071102667.html?nav=emailpage
 Gazette: http://www.gazette.net/stories/12102008/potonew200054_32477.shtml
 Common Sense: http://operationfly.org/Media/2dm5yt3.jpg
 JunAng Ilbo: http://operationfly.org/Media/n3swog.jpg

Non-profit organizations based in Washington, D.C.